Dyo Xenoi (in English Two Strangers) is a Greek comedy series that originally aired in Mega Channel for two seasons (1997–98 and 1998–99). The screenplay was written by Alexandros Rigas and Dimitrios Apostolou. The series stars Nikos Sergianopoulos, Evelina Papoulia, Ntina Konsta, Chrysoula Diavati and Alexandros Rigas. It was one of the most successful series of the Greek television and it won the best comedy series award in the "Prosopa" Greek Television Awards, in 1998. It comprised from 66 episodes and lasted two seasons.

Plot
Teacher of acting and director Konstantinos Markoras falls in love with TV presenter of a morning program Marina Kountouratou. They are entirely different and opposed persons, so its relation causes hilarious situations. In the story, some even persons were involved such as the mother of the director, a rich and eccentric widow, the editor of the morning broadcast and the housekeeper of the rich widow.

Cast
 Nikos Sergianopoulos as Konstantinos Markoras
 Evelina Papoulia as Marina Kountouratou
 Dina Konsta as Deni Markora
 Chrysoula Diavati as Flora Barbaritsa
 Alexandros Rigas as Tolis Sideratos

References

External links

Greek television sitcoms
Mega Channel original programming
1997 Greek television series debuts
1999 Greek television series endings
1990s Greek television series